Warrior King may refer to:

 Warrior King (musician) (Mark Dyer, born 1979), a Jamaican reggae singer
 Tom-Yum-Goong, a 2005 Thai action film released in the United Kingdom as Warrior King
 Warrior King, a 2008 Iraq War memoir by Nathan Sassaman

See also
 Warrior Kings, a 2002 video game